Lafayette Swamp Cats were an American soccer team, founded in 2000. The team was a member of the United Soccer Leagues Premier Development League (PDL), the fourth tier of the American Soccer Pyramid, until 2004, when the team left the league and the franchise was terminated.

They were given "provisional status" in 2000, and played 12 exhibition games against other PDL sides, before joining the league full-time in 2001 as the Louisiana Outlaws, a name they kept until 2003, when they changed their name to the Swamp Cats.

The Swamp Cats played their home games at Clark Field in the city of Lafayette, Louisiana. The team's colors were red and yellow.

Year-by-year

Competition history

Coaches
  Sean Connor

Stadia
 Clark Field, Lafayette, Louisiana 2003–04

References

Defunct soccer clubs in Louisiana
Defunct Premier Development League teams
2000 establishments in Louisiana
2004 disestablishments in Louisiana
S